A presentation folder is a kind of folder that holds loose papers or documents together for organization and protection. Presentation folders usually consist of a sheet of heavy paper stock or other thin, but stiff, material which is folded in half with pockets in order to keep paper documents. Presentation folders function much like that of a file folder for organizational purposes. They can be either printed or plain and can be used, amongst other things, as a tool for business presentations to customers to aid in the sales process.

Uses of presentation folders 

Presentation folders come in many different styles to suit a variety of purposes. Most all are produced by a company to provide marketing for a product (business) and/or service, but they can fulfil other functions. A few examples would be a company producing a new product and wanted to show their customers all the benefits of that product in an organized fashion, or folders used to organise documents for distribution to delegates at a conference.

Some types of presentation folders:
 Standard 9" x 12" two-pocket
Tri-fold or Tri-panel
 Capacity (usually with a 1/4"+ spine to hold more)
 Tabbed (for use in hanging files or filing cabinets)
 Mini or small 
 Green or Eco-friendly

Examples

See also 

 Manila folder 
 File folder 
 Ring binder

References

External links 
Folder Retailers
300 Outstanding Presentation Folder Design Examples

Office equipment
Paper products
Stationery
Sales